This is a list of rail accidents in Spain.

Rail accidents in Spain

Before 1920

1920–1929

1930–1939

1940–1949

1950–1959

1960–1969

1970–1979

1980–1989

1990–1999

2000–2009

2010–2019

2020–current

See also 
 List of rail accidents by country

References

External links 
 El tercer siniestro ferroviario más grave de España

Accidents
Spain
Railway accidents and incidents in Spain